Colin Tobias Eisler is an art historian, Robert Lehman Professor of Fine Arts at New York University's Institute of Fine Arts, and a widely published expert on early Netherlandish art.

Eisler was born in Hamburg, Germany in 1931. His family subsequently moved to the United States, where Eisler received his undergraduate degree from Yale University in 1952. He studied at Oxford from 1952 to 1953, then completed his master's degree at Harvard University the following year. He was hired to teach art history at Yale from 1955–1957 while he was working on his doctorate. Eisler received his PhD from Harvard in 1957, and spent the following year as a Fellow at the Institute for Advanced Study in Princeton, New Jersey. He has taught at New York University since 1958.

His research and writing have been furthered by many grants and awards, including a Guggenheim Fellowship, a National Endowment for the Humanities Senior Fellowship, and a Henry Fellowship at Magdalen College, Oxford. He was the recipient of a festschrift for his 80th birthday in 2011, when his colleagues published New Studies on Old Masters: Essays in Renaissance Art in Honour of Colin Eisler.

Selected works
1963. German Drawings from the 16th Century to the Expressionists. New York: Shorewood. 
1975. The Seeing Hand: A Treasury of Great Master Drawings. Harper & Row. 
1989. The Genius of Jacopo Bellini. New York: Harry N. Abrams. 
1991. Durer's Animals. Washington: Smithsonian Institution Press. 
1995. Paintings in the Hermitage. Stewart, Tabori and Chang. 
1996.  Masterworks in Berlin: A City's Paintings Reunited. Boston: Little, Brown and Company. 
2003. Early Netherlandish Painting: The Thyssen-Bornemisza Collection. Philip Wilson Publishers. 
2012. Flemish And Dutch Drawings From The Fifteenth To The Eighteenth Century: Drawings Of The Masters. Literary Licensing, Inc.

References
Sorenson, Lee. "Eisler, Colin Tobias" in Dictionary of Art Historians Online. Retrieved 24 June 2019.
"Colin Eisler." Institute of Fine Arts, New York University. Retrieved 30 September 2013.

External links
 

1931 births
Living people
American art historians
German emigrants to the United States
New York University faculty
Harvard University alumni
Yale University alumni